The Golden Mile is the name given to the stretch of Promenade between the North and South piers in Blackpool, England. It emerged in the late 19th century, when small-time amusement ride operators, fortune-tellers, phrenologists and oyster bars set up in the front gardens of boarding houses, to take advantage of passing trade near the now-demolished Blackpool Central railway station.

It received its nickname later, partly due to the very high concentration of slot machines which would dominate the area. The promenade is actually  in length. Today, it is home to the Coral Island and Funland amusement arcades, and, until November 2009, hosted the official Doctor Who exhibition.

References

External links
 The Gold Mile in Blackpool
 Tram Ride Along the Golden Mile in 4K

Tourist attractions in Blackpool